Uroš Stamenić (born 14 October 1996) is a Serbian footballer, who plays as a winger for IMT.

Club career
He made his Serbian SuperLiga debut for Vojvodina on 25 May 2014 in 2:0 away win against Napredak Kruševac. After two spells he spent with Proleter Novi Sad while with his home club, Vojvodina, Stamenić permanently moved to Borac Čačak in August 2017. In June 2018, Stamenić moved back to Proleter Novi Sad as a single-player.

References

External links
 Uroš Stamenić Stats at utakmica.rs
 

1996 births
Footballers from Novi Sad
Living people
Association football forwards
Serbian footballers
FK Vojvodina players
FK Proleter Novi Sad players
FK Borac Čačak players
FK Zlatibor Čajetina players
FK IMT players
Serbian First League players
Serbian SuperLiga players